Functional currency refers to the main currency used by a business or unit of a business.  It is the monetary unit of account of the principal economic environment in which an economic entity operates.

International Accounting Standards (IAS) and U.S. Generally Accepted Accounting Principles (GAAP)  provide rules for translation of foreign currency transactions and financial statements. SFAS 52 introduced the concept of functional currency, defined as "the currency of the primary economic environment in which the entity operates; normally, that is, the currency of the environment in which an entity primarily generates and expends cash."

Businesses may enter into transactions (sales, payments, etc.) in multiple currencies.  Each qualified business unit (QBU) of the business translates these items to its functional currency at an appropriate exchange rate.  It then prepares periodic reports of its position (balance sheet) and activity (income and cash flow statements) in that functional currency.  When various QBUs are combined, these reports are translated and consolidated to become financial statements.  Translation of statements may result in translation differences, which are accounted for as a cumulative translation adjustment.

Transactions are often translated at the spot rate, i.e., the rate of exchange between the transaction currency and the functional currency on the date of the transaction.  Example:  Jim is traveling on business and pays a hotel bill for SFR 200.  Jim's home currency is the GBP.  On the date Jim pays the bill, the exchange rate is SFR2 = GBP 1.  Jim records an expense of GBP 100.  Alternatively, businesses may record transactions in another currency using some sort of standard rate for some period, such as the average rate for the month.

Businesses using the accrual method of accounting may recognize revenue or expense in one period and receive or pay it in another.  In the intervening period the exchange rate may have changed.  When an accrued item is settled, the difference due to exchange rate movement in the amount accrued and the amount settled is treated as foreign exchange gain or loss.  This gain or loss is recognized in the same manner as the underlying transactions, such as an ordinary travel expense.

See also 
 although Base currency is sometimes used as a synonym, 'functional currency' is the more precise term
 Inflation accounting
 Inflation
 Accounting
 Economics
 Money
 Banking
 Business
 Hyperinflation
 Historical cost
 Money illusion

References 

Currency